Clyde Duncan (7 January 1954 – 27 July 2011) was a West Indian cricket umpire. He stood in two Test matches between 1991 and 1994, 21 One Day Internationals between 1988 and 2010 and six Twenty20 Internationals between 2008 and 2010. He died in 2011 in Trinidad from cancer.

See also
 List of Test cricket umpires
 List of One Day International cricket umpires
 List of Twenty20 International cricket umpires

References

1954 births
2011 deaths
Guyanese cricket umpires
West Indian Test cricket umpires
West Indian One Day International cricket umpires
West Indian Twenty20 International cricket umpires